Nick Hannig (born 11 September 1986) is a German professional boxer.

Professional boxing career
On 10 March 2018, he faced off against Adam Bashanov in a super-middleweight bout in Bashanov's hometown of Struer, Denmark. Hannig won via sixth-round knockout.

On 6 October 2018, he took on UK fighter Kyle Redfearn. Hannig won the fight by way of a six-second, fourth-round knockout.

On 9 February 2019, he faced off against Ryan Ford for the vacant WBC International light-heavyweight title. Hannig won via twelve-round unanimous decision.

On 6 July 2019, he retained the title against South African boxer Ryno Liebenberg. The fight ended in a majority draw. 

On 26 October 2019, he defended the title in a rematch against Ryno Liebenberg. Hannig retained his title via twelve-round unanimous decision.

Professional boxing record

References

External links

1986 births
Living people
German male boxers
Light-heavyweight boxers
Super-middleweight boxers
Place of birth missing (living people)
Boxers from Berlin